Sissal Kampmann (born 1974) is a Faroese poet. She grew up in Vestmanna in the Faroe Islands. After finishing the Faroese University-preparatory school (in Faroese called Studentaskúli, in Danish: Gymnasium) in Tórshavn, she moved to Denmark to study Nordic literature at the University of Copenhagen.

She published her first poetry collection in 2011, while living in Copenhagen. The poems were written in Faroese and were published by the Faroese-owned Forlaget Eksil. In September 2012 she received the Klaus Rifbjerg's Debutant Prize.

Bibliography

Poems 
 2016 - Sunnudagsland, Mentanargrunnur Studentafelgasins
 2014 - Hyasinttíð, (“Hyacinth time”) Mentanargrunnur Studentafelgasins
 2013 - 4D. Copenhagen, Forlaget Eksil.
 2012 - Endurtøkur. Copenhagen, Forlaget Eksil.
 2011 - Ravnar á ljóðleysum flogi – yrkingar úr uppgongdini. Copenhagen, Forlaget Eksil.

Prizes and grants 
2013 - One year grant from the Mentanargrunnur Landsins (Faroese Cultural Fund)
2012 - Klaus Rifbjerg's Debutant Prize

References 

21st-century Faroese poets
Faroese writers
Faroese-language poets
Faroese women writers
Living people
People from Vestmanna Municipality
1974 births
Faroese women poets
21st-century Danish women writers